Gudiya Hamari Sabhi Pe Bhari is an Indian television comedy drama which premiered on August 27, 2019, on &TV, starring Sarika Bahroliya, Karam Rajpal and Sartaj Gill. The story revolves around Gudiya, a goofy, ordinary looking, free-spirited girl whose family is desperate to find a spouse for her.

Plot

Gudiya Humari Sabhi Pe Bhari is a Hindi television comedy drama show starring Sarika Bahroliya, Sartaj Gill and Karam Rajpal. The story revolves around Gudiya, a goofy, ordinary looking, free-spirited girl whose family is desperate to find a spouse for her. After being rejected by many men, her family finally finds a boy for her. Will Gudiya find her true soul mate?

Gudiya creates troubles and solves the trouble with her funny activities. Gudiya shows her positive side beautifully in whole series, and story ends up without Gudiya's Marriage

Cast

Main 
 Sarika Bahroliya as Pratibha Gupta aka Gudiya— Sarla and Radhe's daughter and Pappu's sister (2019– 2021) 
 Sarika Bahroliya as Jhumri— Gudiya's look-alike (2020)

Recurring 
 Samta Sagar as Sarla Gupta– Radhe's wife, Alka, Papu and Gudiya's mother (2019– 2021)
 Ravi Mahashabde as Radhe Mohan Gupta– Sarla's husband, Alka, Pappu and Gudiya's father (2019– 2021)
 Manmohan Tiwari as Pradeep Gupta aka Pappu– Sarla and Radhe's son, Sweety's husband, Alka and Gudiya's brother (2019– 2021)
 Shweta Rajput as Sweety Gupta– Pappu's wife, Nanhelal's daughter (2019– 2021) 
 Sudheer Neema as Nanhelal Gupta– Sweety's father (2019– 2021)
 Sarrtaj Gill as Muddhu Kandhele– Gudiya's fiancé (2019)
 Karam Rajpal as Guddu Pahalwan– Gudiya's Friend (2020– 2021)
 Neela Mulherkar as Savitri Gupta aka Jiya– Radhe's mother, Alka, Gudiya and Pappu's grandmother (2019– 2021)
 Khushboo Jain as Alka Gupta– Radhe and Sarla's daughter, Gudiya and Pappu's sister (2019– 2021)
 Abdur Rehman Shaikh as Bantu– Alka's son, Pappu and Gudiya's nephew (2019– 2021)
 Saroj Sharma as Rajkumari– Alka, Gudiya and Pappu's aunt, Sarla's aunt (2020)
 Abha Parmar as PutliBai– Guddu's grandmother (2020– 2021)
 Madhuri Sanjeev as Harbheji (2020)

Episodic Cast (Guest Appearance)
 Shivam Sengar as Raju
 Manish Kaushik as Vinod– Alka's husband 
 Dolly Kaushik as Rubi Gupta– Pappu, Alka and Gudiya's cousin sister
 Chandrahas Pandey as Suresh Nagoriya– Rubi's ex-fiancé
 Nirmal Choudhary as Shyam Gupta– Radhe's brother, Rubi's father
 Ali Raza Naamdar as Hukumchand Kandhele– Muddhu's father
 Ashiwini Shukla as Saroj– Sweety'friend, Pappu's ex-girlfriend
 Habib Mithiborwala as Rocky
 Zayn Khan as 1st boy to meet gudiya
 Anmol Jain as Manoj
 Pari Gala as Sajili
 Urmeila M Sharma as Kamla
 Anjali Singh as Fraud ghost
 Ishitiyak Khan as Ballu 
 Saurabh Patel as Manoj Pathak
 Manisha Rani as Manisha Rani 
 Khushboo Sawan as Champa/Suman– Ballu's first wife, Pappu's ex-girlfriend
 Kaushiki Rathore as Chameli– Ballu's second wife
 Jyotsana Trivedi as Menaka
 Kishan Bhan as Mathai Dadda - caretaker of  Putlibai's haveli 
 Aman Gandhi as Gabbar
 Roslyn D'souza as Nanhi
 Braj Kishor as Madhav
 Pawan Singh as Atta Chacha
 Sambhavna Seth as Mahua 
 Amit Poddar as Monti– Bhojpuri director
 Juhi Aslam as Vandana Pateriya
 Shubham Vyas as Neelu Pathak– Vandana's lover
 Payal Sharma as Pinki– Vandana's cousin
 Rani Chatterjee as Gulabo
 Sandeep Aanand as Sandeep aka Chamatkaar
 Neha Kandalgaonkar as Guest appearance (Dance performance with Sandeep) 
 Annu Awasthi as himself
 Bhavana Balsavar as Babli Bua
 Vivaan Mudgal as Nikka
 Jay Soni as Hulchal Pandey
 Gopi Desai as Bijli Amma
 Ankur Jain as Vidyut
 Harshi Sharma as Komal
 Saachi Priya as Dolly
 Shefali rana as Gudiya's taiji

References

External links 

 
 Gudiya Hamari Sabhi Pe Bhari on ZEE5

&TV original programming
2019 Indian television series debuts